Ronald Andrés Ramírez Villa (born 23 November 1976, in Montevideo) is a retired Uruguayan footballer.

Club career
Ramírez had a spell with San Luis F.C. in the Primera Division de Mexico. He also played in Colombia for Independiente Santa Fe and La Equidad.

International career
Ramírez made one appearance for the senior Uruguay national football team, a friendly against Venezuela on 20 November 2002.

References

 
 

1976 births
Living people
Uruguayan footballers
Uruguay international footballers
Uruguayan Primera División players
Liga MX players
Categoría Primera A players
Montevideo Wanderers F.C. players
Peñarol players
C.A. Progreso players
San Luis F.C. players
Independiente Santa Fe footballers
La Equidad footballers
Central Español players
Uruguayan expatriate footballers
Expatriate footballers in Colombia
Expatriate footballers in Mexico
Footballers from Montevideo
Association football midfielders